Dwayne Pascal Green (born 3 September 1996) is a football player who plays as a left back. Born in the Netherlands, he represents Barbados internationally.

Club career
He made his professional debut in the Eerste Divisie for RKC Waalwijk on 12 August 2016 in a game against FC Emmen. He joined FC Dordrecht on a two-year deal in the summer of 2018, with an option for a further year. After two years at Dordrecht, he signed for FC Den Bosch on a free transfer in the summer of 2020, signing a one-year contract with the club with the option for a second season.

International career
He made his debut for Barbados national football team on 2 July 2021 in a Gold Cup qualifier against Bermuda that Bermuda won 8–1.

Personal life
Green was born in the Netherlands to a Barbadian father and Greek Cypriot mother.

References

External links
 

1996 births
Living people
Dutch footballers
Dutch people of Barbadian descent
People with acquired Barbadian citizenship
Dutch people of Greek descent
Barbadian footballers
Barbados international footballers
RKC Waalwijk players
FC Dordrecht players
FC Den Bosch players
Eerste Divisie players
Association football defenders
Footballers from Gorinchem